Virtue is moral excellence.

Virtue(s) may also refer to:

Film and television
 Virtue (film), a 1932 American film starring Carole Lombard and Pat O'Brien
 The Virtues (TV series), a 2019 British drama series
 "Virtue" (Law & Order), a 1994 television episode

Music
 Virtue (musical group), an American gospel music trio
 The Virtues (band), a 1950s American rock and roll band
 Virtue (Eldar Djangirov album), 2009
 Virtue (Emmy the Great album), 2011
 Virtue (Virtue album), 1997
 Virtue (The Voidz album), 2018
 Virtues (album), by Amber Pacific, 2010
 "Virtue", a song by Bloc Party, 2016
 "Virtue", a song by CeCe Peniston from Finally, 1992
 "Virtue", a song by Jim Guthrie from Morning Noon Night, 2002

People
 Virtue (surname), a list of people with the name
 Virtue Hampton Whitted (1922–2007), American jazz singer and bassist

Other uses
 Ethan Edwards, or Virtue, a Marvel Comics superhero
 Virtue (angel), a type of angel in the Christian angelic hierarchy
 Virtue (software), a VM virtual session manager
 Virtue Audio, an American manufacturer of integrated amplifiers
 Virtue Hills, a mountain range in Oregon, US
 Virtue, in role-playing games statistics, an advantageous character attribute

See also
 
 
 Vertue, a surname
Virtu (disambiguation)
 Virtus (disambiguation)